Live.01 is Isis's first live release, recorded on September 23, 2003, at the Fillmore in San Francisco, California, USA. It is sourced from an audience bootleg recording and, as such, does not sound professionally recorded. The fan who made this performance did not properly record the first song ("From Sinking") and thus this release is not totally complete.

As with the rest of the live series, the CD version was self-released. The vinyl edition was handled, in this instance, by the Electric Human Project. It was re-released on May 31, 2011 in digital format almost a year after Isis' dissolution, as part of a cycle in which all of Isis' live albums were re-released.

Track listing
All songs written by Isis.
 "Carry" – 6:59
 "Hym" – 9:31
 "Weight" – 13:29
 "The Beginning and the End" – 10:24

Personnel
Band members
 Jeff Caxide – bass guitar
 Aaron Harris – drums
 Michael Gallagher – guitar
 Bryant Clifford Meyer – electronics and guitar
 Aaron Turner – vocals, guitar and design

Other personnel
 Brooke Gillespie – live audio recording
 Jason Hellman – website
 Greg Moss – live sound
 Nick Zampiello – mastering

References

External links 
 Live I at Bandcamp (streamed copy where licensed)

Isis (band) live albums
Albums with cover art by Aaron Turner
2004 live albums